Millersburg is an unincorporated community in Stampers Creek Township, Orange County, in the U.S. state of Indiana.

History
Millersburg was named for Greenup Miller, who opened a store there in about 1833.

Geography

References

Unincorporated communities in Indiana
Unincorporated communities in Orange County, Indiana